Carew St John-Mildmay (2 February 180013 July 1878) was Archdeacon of Essex from 18 February 1862 until his death.

The son of Henry St John-Mildmay, 3rd Baronet he was born at Dogmersfield Park. He was educated at Oriel College, Oxford. He held livings at Shorwell, Burnham-on-Crouch and Chelmsford.

References

1796 births
People from Hampshire (before 1974)
Archdeacons of Essex
19th-century English Anglican priests
1878 deaths